The women's 200 metres at the 2019 World Athletics Championships was held at the Khalifa International Stadium in Doha, Qatar, from 30 September to 2 October 2019.

Summary
The season world No. 1 and previous bronze medalist Shaunae Miller-Uibo concentrated on the 400 metres and did not enter. The defending champion and world No. 13 Dafne Schippers and previous silver medalist and world No. 9 Marie-Josée Ta Lou opted not to start in the heats. Olympic champion and world No. 2 Elaine Thompson didn't start in the semi-finals. 2013 bronze medallist and world No. 3 Blessing Okagbare was disqualified in the heats due to a lane infringement. 2013 champion and world No. 7 Shelly-Ann Fraser-Pryce focused on 100m. The only athlete in the field with a personal best below 22 seconds was Dina Asher-Smith, making her the overwhelming favorite going into the Championships.

In the first steps of the final, Asher-Smith took a clear lead, making up the stagger on Dezerea Bryant to her outside just after halfway through the turn.  As the stagger resolved coming onto the straight, it revealed Bryant was in second place, slightly ahead of Brittany Brown and Mujinga Kambundji, meaning Asher-Smith had a huge lead.  Down the straight, the only athlete looking like she was making any progress cutting down the gap was Brown.		
Asher-Smith didn't let up, crossing the finish line with a clear win by 3 metres, Brown also clearly ahead by another 3 metres over Kambundji.	

Asher-Smith's 21.88 was a new British national record.  Kambundji won the first sprint medal for Switzerland at a global outdoor championship.  The closest was Marcel Schelbert who also took a bronze in the 400 hurdles in 1999.

In the semi-finals, winner Asher-Smith returned to the track to assist an injured rival, Antonique Strachan, a gesture which earned her a nomination for the International Fair Play Award.

Records
Before the competition records were as follows:

The following records were set at the competition:

Schedule
The event schedule, in local time (UTC+3), was as follows:

Results

Heats
The first three in each heat (Q) and the next six fastest (q) qualify for the semifinal.

Wind:Heat 1: -0.3 m/s, Heat 2: +0.2 m/s, Heat 3: +0.7 m/s, Heat 4: +0.4 m/s, Heat 5: +0.8 m/s, Heat 6: -0.1 m/s

Semi-finals
The first two in each heat (Q) and the next two fastest (q) qualified for the final.

Wind:Heat 1: +0.4 m/s, Heat 2: +0.4 m/s, Heat 3: +0.5 m/s

Final
The final was started on 2 October 22:35.

Wind: +0.9 m/s

References

200
200 metres at the World Athletics Championships